Hocquart may refer to:

 Gilles Hocquart (1694–1783), Intendant of New France from 1731 to 1748
 Hocquart Lake, a body of water in Quebec, Canada
 Prix Hocquart, a horse race

Surnames of French origin